Léon Battu was a French dramatist, born 1829 in Paris, where he died on 22 November 1857.

Life and career
The son of Pantaléon Battu (1799–1870), a violinist and assistant conductor at the Opéra de Paris, and brother of the soprano Marie Battu (1838-1888) who created Inès in L'Africaine, he wrote many vaudevilles and libretti. In the fields of opéra-comique and opérettes, these were in collaboration with Ludovic Halévy, Michel Carré, Jules Barbier, Jules Moinaux and Lockroy. His composers were Jacques Offenbach (Pépito, Le mariage aux lanternes), Adolphe Adam (Les Pantins de Violette), Victor Massé (La Reine Topaze), Georges Bizet and Charles Lecocq (Le Docteur Miracle). With Halévy he translated Mozart's Der Schauspieldirektor for its Mozart centenary production at the Théâtre des Bouffes-Parisiens in 1856.

He died at the age of 29 after years of illness and his funeral service on 24 November 1857 was attended by more than 500 people, including much of literary and musical Paris.

Works

Theatre 
Les extrêmes se touchent, with Adrien Decourcelle, 27 January 1848, Théâtre des Variétés, Paris
Les Deux font la paire, with Michel Carré, 25 October 1848, Théâtre des Variétés
Les Suites d'un feu d'artifice, with Arthur de Beauplan and Clairville, 1848, Théâtre du Vaudeville, Paris
Jobin et Nanette, with Michel Carré, 1 May 1849, Théâtre des Variétés
Nisus et Euryale, with Eugène Bercioux, 1850, Théâtre des Variétés
Madame Diogène, with Nérée Desarbres, 1852, Théâtre du Vaudeville
Les Quatre Coins, 7 November 1852, Théâtre de l'Odéon, Paris
L'Honneur de la maison, with Maurice Desvignes, 6 July 1853, Théâtre de la Porte-Saint-Martin, Paris
Un Verre de Champagne, with Adrien Decourcelle, 1855, Théâtre des Variétés
Lucie Didier, with Adolphe Jaime fils, 12 January 1856, Théâtre du Vaudeville
Les Cheveux de ma femme, with Eugène Labiche, 19 January 1856, Théâtre des Variétés

Opéras comiques, operettas 
Le Trésor à Mathurin, music by Jacques Offenbach, 7 May 1855, Salle Herz, Paris
Jacqueline ou la Fille du soldat, with Eugène Labiche and Édouard Fournier, music by Jules Costé and the Comte d'Osmond, 8 June 1855, Opéra-Comique, Paris
L'Anneau d'argent, with Jules Barbier, music by Louis Deffès, 5 July 1855, Opéra-Comique, Paris
Pépito, with Jules Moinaux, music by Jacques Offenbach, 28 October 1855, Théâtre des Variétés
Élodie ou le Forfait nocturne, with Hector Crémieux, music by Jacques Offenbach, 19 January 1856, Bouffes-Parisiens, Paris
Les Pantins de Violette, with Ludovic Halévy, music by Adolphe Adam, 29 April 1856, Bouffes-Parisiens
L'Imprésario, translation, with Ludovic Halévy, music by Mozart, 20 May 1856, Bouffes-Parisiens
La Reine Topaze, with Lockroy, music by Victor Massé, 27 December 1856, Théâtre-Lyrique
Le Docteur Miracle, with Ludovic Halévy, two versions: one by Georges Bizet, the other by Charles Lecocq, 9 April 1857, Bouffes-Parisiens
Le Cousin de Marivaux, with Ludovic Halévy, music by Victor Massé, 15 August 1957, Baden-Baden
Le Mariage aux lanternes, with Michel Carré, music by Jacques Offenbach, 10 October 1857, Bouffes-Parisiens

References

External links 
 Léon battu on data.bnf.fr

French opera librettists
19th-century French dramatists and playwrights
19th-century French male writers
Writers from Paris
1829 births
1857 deaths